David N. Duerden (born April 11, 1977) is a Canadian former ice hockey player who played two games for the Florida Panthers of the National Hockey League during the 1999–2000 season. He was drafted 80th overall by the Panthers in the 1995 NHL Entry Draft, but spent most of his time in the minor leagues. In 2001, he was traded to the New York Rangers for future considerations but was assigned to their ECHL affiliate the Charlotte Checkers after never playing a game for the Rangers. After one season with the Checkers he signed with Porin Assat of the Finnish Liiga. An injury suffered in practice prior to the start of the 2002–03 season ended his career.

Career statistics

References

External links
 

1977 births
Living people
Beast of New Haven players
Canadian ice hockey left wingers
Charlotte Checkers (1993–2010) players
Florida Panthers draft picks
Florida Panthers players
Fort Wayne Komets players
Hartford Wolf Pack players
Ice hockey people from Ontario
Kentucky Thoroughblades players
Louisville Panthers players
Miami Matadors players
Peterborough Petes (ice hockey) players
Port Huron Border Cats players
Sportspeople from Oshawa